Jan Sithole was a Swaziland trade union activist and politician. Sithole was president of the Swaziland Democratic Party (Swadepa), and was in October 2013 elected to the House of Assembly of Eswatini (the lower house of the Parliament of Swaziland). He passed on the 12th of September 2020.

Background 
Sithole passed away on the 12 September 2020. During his active years, Sithole was the leader of the Swaziland Federation of Trade Unions (SFTU) for 25 years. He stepped down in October 2009.

In 1995, Sithole was threatened with deportation, and later kidnapped and abandoned in the boot of a car.

He was arrested on 30 January 1997 in an attempt to head off a general strike, along with SFTU senior officers, Richard Nxumalo, Jabulani Nxumalo and Themba Msibi. They were charged with threatening bus company owners to keep their vehicles off the road, but were released after a magistrate found there was no basis to the charges.

In 2002 he was publicly threatened by a Swazi senator and government delegate to the International Labour Organization.

Parliament 
In the 20 September 2013 elections for Swaziland's House of Assembly, Sithole was elected as one of 55 MPs, nominally as an independent (since Swaziland does not recognize political parties. Sithole and his organization were pledged to reform the current governance system in Swaziland from the inside, to "achieve a multiparty Swaziland but through a strategy of participating, as opposed to non-participation". He stated that he was not the only member of his party elected.

References

Members of the House of Assembly of Eswatini
Swazi trade union leaders
Living people
Date of birth missing (living people)
Place of birth missing (living people)
Year of birth missing (living people)